Karlie is an English and Swedish feminine given name that is a feminine form of Karl, a diminutive form of Karla and an alternate form of Karly. Notable people known by this name include the following:

Given name
Karlie Hay (born 1997), American model and beauty pageant titleholder (Miss Teen USA 2016)
Karlie Kloss (born 1992), American fashion model and entrepreneur
Karlie Noon, indigenous Australia astronomer
Karlie Redd (born 1974), American television personality, hip-hop artist, model and actress
Karlie Samuelson (born 1995), American basketball player

See also

Carlie
Karle (name)
Karlee
Karli (name)
Karlin (surname)
Karline

Notes

English feminine given names
Swedish feminine given names